Zaffaroni is an Italian surname. Notable people with the surname include:

Alejandro Zaffaroni (1923–2014), Uruguayan-American businessman
Marco Zaffaroni (born 1969), Italian footballer and manager
Raúl Zaffaroni (born 1940), Argentine supreme court justice

Italian-language surnames